Vojislav Bela Čuzdi (24 October 1926 – 10 January 1997) was a Serbian wrestler. He competed in the men's Greco-Roman welterweight at the 1952 Summer Olympics.

References

External links
 

1926 births
1997 deaths
Serbian male sport wrestlers
Olympic wrestlers of Yugoslavia
Wrestlers at the 1952 Summer Olympics
Place of birth missing